Geophilus ampyx is a species of soil centipede in the family Geophilidae found in North America, especially South Carolina. It grows up to 52 millimeters in length, though it averages 30–40, has 49–53 leg pairs in males and 51–55 in females, and is bright red in color. G. ampyx also bears five sclerotized and deeply pigmented labral teeth and a nearly entirely exposed prebasal plate. It's often confused with G. mordax, though it can be differentiated by the absence of sacculi.

References 

ampyx
Animals described in 1954